Ghulam Mohammad Lalzad Baloch or Lalzad Baloch is a Baluchi language broadcast journalist, based in Toronto, Canada.  He is originally from Nimroz Afghanistan. He was with the Baluchi service of All India Radio from 1974 to 2003.

Early life
His attended Farokhi school in Zaranj, Nimroz, Noon. He studied law and political science at Kabul University (Department of Justice) and earned a PhD in literature (She'r e Ma'sir e Dari in Afghanistan) from Jamia Millia Islamia University, Delhi.

Career 
He joined Radio Afghanistan as a university student. from 1972 to 1974, he worked with All India Radio's Balochi service from 1974 to 2003. He runs two news services.  He also works with Hamwatan Translation Company.

See also
Nimruz Province
Baloch people
Balochi language

References

External links

Balochi-language writers
Living people
1951 births